Solomon Heydenfeldt (1816 – September 15, 1890) was an American attorney who was an associate justice of the California Supreme Court from 1852 to 1857. He was the second Jewish justice of the court, after Henry A. Lyons, but was the first elected by direct vote of the people.

Biography
In 1816, Heydenfeldt was born in Charleston, South Carolina. He read law in the offices of William F. De Saussure, a son of the noted Chancellor Henry William de Saussure. In 1837, at 21 years of age, Heydenfeldt moved to Russell County and Tallapoosa County, Alabama. There, he was admitted to the state bar, practiced law, and in 1841 served as a judge.

In 1850, he moved to California and was admitted to the bar. In 1851, his brother, Elcan Heydenfeldt, served as President pro tempore of the California State Senate, and Solomon unsuccessfully sought the Democratic Party nomination to the United States Senate.

In October 1851, he ran against Whig Party candidate, Tod Robinson, to fill the seat of Serranus Clinton Hastings, and won a six year term. Heydenfeldt's notable opinions include Irwin v. Phillips, which established the doctrine of prior appropriation in western water law jurisprudence. In March 1852, he returned to Alabama to visit his family, and his absence from the state led to a court opinion on whether his seat was "vacant".

On January 6, 1857, he stepped down from the bench, and joined Vermont-born brothers Oscar L. Shafter and James McMillan Shafter in forming the law firm of Shafter, Shafter, Park and Heydenfeldt, along with Trevor Park, in San Francisco. While in private practice, Heydenfeldt argued before the California Supreme Court in Ex Parte Newman (1858), where he successfully defended a Jewish man's right to work on Sunday.

In 1862, during the Civil War, he refused on principle to take a test oath for lawyers of loyalty to the Union cause (as did Virginia-born James D. Thornton), which led to his semi-retirement from the Bar.

Civic activities
Heydenfeldt helped found the first free kindergarten in San Francisco, along with New York professor Felix Adler.

Personal life
He married twice: first, in Alabama, to Catherine Heydenfeldt, who died July 3, 1887, and then, in California, to Elisabeth A. Heydenfeldt, who survived him. He had ten children. His son, Solomon, graduated from Santa Clara University and in October 1872 became an attorney, and his nephew, Walter P. Levy, was a judge of the San Francisco Superior Court.

See also
 List of justices of the Supreme Court of California
 Alexander O. Anderson
 Alexander Wells
 Charles Henry Bryan
 David S. Terry
 Hugh Murray
 State Bar of California

References

External links
 Solomon Heydenfeldt. California Supreme Court Historical Society. Retrieved July 18, 2017.
 Past & Present Justices. California State Courts. Retrieved July 19, 2017.

1816 births
1890 deaths
Lawyers from Charleston, South Carolina
19th-century American Jews
19th-century American judges
19th-century American lawyers
Justices of the Supreme Court of California
Superior court judges in the United States
U.S. state supreme court judges admitted to the practice of law by reading law
Jewish American attorneys
Lawyers from San Francisco
California Democrats